Psi-ya-hus (also spelled Psai-Yah-hus) is a spirit rock near the Fauntleroy ferry terminal in Seattle, Washington. Coast Salish peoples associate the rock with A'yahos, a "malevolent and dangerous" spirit, capable of shapeshifting, who sometimes appears in a two-headed serpent form, who is associated with other earthquake-related areas like landslides near the Seattle Fault.

LIDAR imagery of the Seattle area revealed a previously unknown landslide in the Fauntleroy area. Another area associated with the a'yahos near Mercer Island could be related to the Lake Washington sunken forests, caused by landslides triggered by a Seattle Fault event around 900 CE.

References

External links

 

Sacred rocks
Religious places of the indigenous peoples of North America
Rock formations of Seattle
Coast Salish culture